Chrysomus is a genus of bird in the family Icteridae. Established by William John Swainson in 1837, it contains the following species:

The name Chrysomus is a transliteration of the Greek word khrusōma, meaning "wrought gold" or "something made of gold".

References

 
Icteridae
Bird genera
Taxonomy articles created by Polbot